Park Won-sang (born January 20, 1970) is a South Korean actor.

Filmography

Film

Television

Theater

Ambassadorship 
Ambassador for 1st Democratization Movement Memorial Park Joint Memorial Cultural Festival (2022)

References

External links
 
 
 

1970 births
Living people
South Korean male television actors
South Korean male film actors
South Korean male stage actors